Ionis Pharmaceuticals, Inc. is a biotechnology company based in Carlsbad, California, that specializes in discovering and developing RNA-targeted therapeutics. The company has 3 commercially approved medicines: Spinraza (Nusinersen), Tegsedi (Inotersen), and Waylivra (Volanesorsen) and has 4 drugs in pivotal studies: tominersen for Huntington’s disease, tofersen for SOD1-ALS, AKCEA-APO(a)-LRx for cardiovascular disease, and AKCEA-TTR-LRx for all forms of TTR amyloidosis.

The company was named Isis Pharmaceuticals until December 2015.

History
The company was founded in 1989 as Isis Pharmaceuticals by Stanley T. Crooke, a former head of research of GlaxoSmithKline, with a goal to commercialize antisense therapy.

In 1992, the company received its first approval by the Food and Drug Administration for an investigational new drug application in 1992 for a genital warts drug candidate. The FDA approval marked the first time for the company to conduct any antisense therapy and to be tested in humans.

In 1995, the genital warts drug failed in clinical trials and Isis terminated development. By that time, Gilead Sciences had left the antisense therapy field, leaving only Isis, Hybridon, Genta and Lynx Therapeutics working in the field. Gilead sold its patents, developed around antisense, to Isis.

In December 2015, Isis changed its name to Ionis, driven in part by the negative image of "Isis" generated by the terrorist group, Islamic State of Iraq and the Levant, commonly known as ISIL or ISIS.

In 2017, the company completed the corporate spin-off of its rare lipid disorder subsidiary, Akcea Therapeutics.

Products
The company's first marketed drug was fomivirsen (Vitravene, used in the treatment of cytomegalovirus retinitis (CMV) in immunocompromised patients. It was discovered at the NIH and was licensed and initially developed by Isis, which subsequently licensed it to Novartis. It was approved by the FDA for CMV in Aug 1998 as the first antisense drug. Novartis withdrew the marketing authorization for fomivirsen in the EU in 2002 and in the US in 2006. The drug was withdrawn as the development of HAART dramatically reduced the number of cases of CMV rinitis.

The antisense field anticipated that the approval of fomivirsen marked the beginning of a new age of antisense drug treatments that would be similar to the uptake of monoclonal antibody therapy, but the next FDA approval of an antisense drug came in 2013. Part of what held up all companies in the field was the way that the oligomers were chemically modified to prevent hydrolysis also reduced affinity to the antisense molecules' targets; by 2004 the field was shifting to second generation modifications. Clinical trials of antisense therapeutics by all the companies in the early 2000s were also plagued by lack of efficacy and immune reactions to drug candidates. Isis cut its workforce by 40% in 2005 due to weak sales of fomivirsen and lack of confidence by the market in antisense technology.

In 2007, Isis and Alnylam Pharmaceuticals, which focuses on RNA interference, formed a 50/50 joint venture, Regulus Therapeutics, to apply their intellectual property and knowledge around oligomer biotherapeutics to micro-RNA targets.

In 2008, Isis and Genzyme entered into a partnered drug candidate mipomersen (Kynamro), intended to treat homozygous familial hypercholesterolemia, and other drug candidates ; the deal included Genzyme buying $150 million of Isis stock and paying a $175 million license fee, as well as milestone fees and royalties. Mipomersen was rejected by the European Medicines Agency in 2012 and again in 2013; it was approved by the FDA in 2013. In January 2016, Ionis terminated its arrangement with Genzyme, stating that the drug had been poorly marketed. In May 2016, Ionis licensed the rights to the drug to Kastle Therapeutics for $15 million upfront with another $10 million due in May 2019, up to $70 million in milestones based on sales, and royalties, with Ionis paying 3% royalty and 3% of non-cash royalty it receives to Genzyme. Mipomersen has still not been approved in Europe.

In December 2016, Ionis's drug nusinersen (Spinraza) was approved by the FDA. It had been discovered in a collaboration between Adrian Krainer at Cold Spring Harbor Laboratory and Ionis (then Isis) and preclinical work was done at University of Massachusetts. The drug was initially developed by Ionis, which partnered with Biogen on development starting in 2012; in 2015 Biogen acquired an exclusive license to the drug for a $75 million license fee, milestone payments up to $150M, and tiered royalties between 10 and 15% thereafter; Biogen also paid for all development subsequent to taking the license. The license to Biogen included licenses to intellectual property that Ionis had acquired from Cold Spring Harbor and University of Massachusetts.

As of December 2016, Ionis had ten candidates for various liver diseases in clinical trials and a drug it discovered, alicaforsen, was in a Phase III trial run by another company. It also had a huntingtin gene-lowering antisense molecule for Huntington's disease in clinical trial.

References

External links

Biotechnology companies of the United States
Biotechnology companies established in 1989
Huntington's disease
Spinal muscular atrophy
Antisense RNA
Health care companies based in California
Companies based in Carlsbad, California
Companies listed on the Nasdaq